Granite Sentry was a Cheyenne Mountain nuclear bunker improvement program "to provide a Message Processing Subsystem and a Video Distribution Subsystem, and [to upgrade] the NORAD Computer System display capability and four major centers: (1) the Air Defense Operations Center, (2) the NORAD Command Center, (3) the Battle Staff Support Center, and (4) the Weather Support Unit."  Granite Sentry was also to process and display "nuclear detection data provided from the Integrated Correlation and Display System."  For $230 million the program was also to "replace display screens of the Attack Warning and Attack Assessment System", and Granite Sentry was delayed from 1993 to 1996.  Granite Sentry and other Cheyenne Mountain Upgrade interfaces were tested in 1997, and Granite Sentry's processing regarding "simulated [nuclear] detonation messages…injected into the Defense Support Program Data Distribution Center [was] not adequate...".

References

Cold War military computer systems of the United States
North American Aerospace Defense Command